Steve Platt is a British journalist and former editor of the New Statesman magazine (in the period when it was known as New Statesman and Society). The fortnightly Statesman column by John Pilger began in 1991, while Platt was editor, after the two men had worked together on media campaigns against the First Gulf war. Platt, "while not securing a spectacular turnaround in the merged New Statesman & Societys fortunes... made it once again readable". Platt was described as "a propagandist, using New Statesman & Society as a platform for various campaigns against executive abuse of state power", and was credited for bringing stability to it by staying with it, remaking it in a September 1994 into "a much glossier magazine with the self-proclaimed 'new politics' of Tony Blair and Gordon Brown". Platt now writes for Red Pepper magazine.

References

External links
 plattitude
 www.steveplatt.net

British male journalists
Living people
Year of birth missing (living people)
New Statesman people